Hu Yitian (born 26 December 1993) is a Chinese actor. He made his acting debut in the television drama A Rush to Dead Summer (2017), and subsequently starred in the 2017 hit web series A Love So Beautiful which brought him wider recognition and several newcomer awards. He later gained fame from around the world in The drama he starred with Xing Fei that aired in 2022 during  the Winter Olympics, their drama was liked by around the world by many fans, and the drama gained popularity

Early life and education
Hu was born on 26 December 1993 in Hangzhou, Zhejiang, China. He majored in landscape architecture at Hangzhou Wanxiang Polytechnic. Hu worked briefly as a model before debuting as an actor.

Career

Beginnings
Hu first appeared in a series of short films titled Cat Tree. He made his official debut in the youth drama Rush to the Dead Summer (2017), playing a minor supporting role.

2017–present: Rising popularity
Hu rose to fame with his role as Jiang Chen in the 2017 hit web series A Love So Beautiful, based on the youth romance novel To Our Pure Little Beauty by Zhao Gangan. Hu also performed the ending theme song for the series, titled It’s a Dream.

From February to April 2018, Hu appeared in the third season of the reality game show Twenty-Four Hours as a regular cast member. Hu was also cast in youth workplace drama Youth Should Be Early, and youth romance drama Unrequited Love.

In 2019, Hu featured in the esports romance comedy drama Go Go Squid! as a computer genius. Despite his short appearance in the series, Hu gained popularity for his role. Forbes China listed Hu under their 30 Under 30 Asia 2019 list which consisted of 30 influential people under 30 years old who have had a substantial effect in their fields.

In 2020, Hu starred in Handsome Siblings, a wuxia drama based on Gu Long’s 1966 novel Juedai Shuangjiao; playing Hua Wuque. The series received positive reviews and high ratings, and Hu was praised for his portrayal of Hua Wuque. The same year, he starred in the republican mystery drama  My Roommate is a Detective as a deduction genius. Hu received positive reviews for his humorous performance as a deduction genius, a stark contrast from his previous characters; as well as chemistry with co-star Zhang Yunlong.

Filmography

Film

Television series

Variety show

Discography

Awards and nominations

References

External links
 

Living people
1993 births
21st-century Chinese male actors
Chinese male television actors
Male actors from Zhejiang